Kapyong may refer to:

Gapyeong, South Korea
Kapyong Barracks, a former Canadian Forces base in Winnipeg, Manitoba, Canada
Battle of Kapyong, a battle of the Korean War
Kapyong (film), a 2011 Australian documentary film about the Battle of Kapyong